The Bogyiszló Orchestra is a Hungarian folk orchestra that plays dance music, and was associated with the  Busójárás carnival in Mohács.

References

 

Hungarian folk music groups